Noxa is an Indonesian grindcore band formed in Jakarta in 2002 by drummer Robin Hutagaol and guitarist Ade Himernio Adnis. The band are known for playing grindcore accompanied by political and humanistic lyrics.

History

Formation
The band was formed by Robin Hutagaol and Ade Himernio Adnis. They soon picked up vocalist Tonny Christian Pangemanan and bassist Dipa Biomantara. The four member of the band shared the same university as students and have known each other for years, occasionally doing some local gigs together. At first they played cover songs from grindcore bands like Nasum and Napalm Death. The name Noxa was chosen because the members of the band were interested in its meaning. Noxa itself means something that exerts a harmful effect on the body.

Debut and second album
Soon after its inception, the band entered the studio in November 2002 for the recording of debut album. Under their own label Noxa Records, the band released self-titled debut album Noxa in August 2003. This was followed by some gigs in Malaysia and Singapore.

Two years after the release of Noxa, the band once again entered the studio to record their second album Grind Viruses. The album was released in 2006 and featured some musician including Keijo Niinimaa of Rotten Sound as lyricist in the song "Starvation". Originally released by Noxa Records, the album was later re-released by Finnish label, Stay Heavy Records, in 2008. In the same year, the band played in Tuska Open Air Metal Festival.

Third album and recent member changes
On 17 January 2009, drummer Robin Hutagaol died in a motorcycle accident. 6 months later, he was replaced by Alvin Eka Putra, this was followed by planning for recording the third album. During this times, Noxa played in Obscene Extreme Festival in Czech Republic.

The third album Legacy was recorded in early 2011. It contains 19 tracks, seven of which were previously drum tracked by Robin Hutagaol before his death. The album was released in July 2011 through Off The Records and once again also featuring other musicians including Jason Netherton of Misery Index and Shane McLachlan of the band Phobia.

On September 14, 2019, vocalist Tonny Christian Pangemanan left the band due to health reason. A new singer Diego Shefa was first announced to public in December 2019. After a year of battling his illness, Tonny Pangemanan died on November 13, 2020.

Musical style
Noxa are known to bring political sociology and humanity theme lyrics in their music. Most of their songs are grindcore typical with short duration, lasting only 1 or 2 minutes or even a few seconds.

Band members
Current members
 Ade Himernio Adnis — guitars (2002–present)
 Dipa Biomantara — bass guitar (2002–present)
 Alvin Eka Putra — drums (2009–present)
 Diego Shefa Dila Negara - vocals (2020–present)

Former member
 Robin Hutagaol — drums (2002–2009; died 2009)
Tonny Christian Pangemanan — vocals (2002-2019; Died 2020)

Timeline

Discography

Studio albums

Extended plays

References

External links
 Official website
 Noxa discography on Discogs

Musical groups established in 2002
Indonesian heavy metal musical groups